Yves Hayat (born 1946 in Cairo, Egypt)  is a French visual artist.

Early life and career
Hayat was born in 1946 in Cairo, Egypt. He left Cairo with his family in 1956 to live in the South of France. In 1967, he started studying art at the École nationale supérieure des arts décoratifs. Since 2006, he has exhibited his works internationally in London, New York, Istanbul, Paris, Monaco, Cologne, Geneva, Vienna, Kuwait and Beirut, among many others.

Selected exhibitions

Solo 

 2023:  Weapons of mass seduction, Galerie Frey, Salzburg, Austria

 2022:  L'enfer du décor, Contemporary Art Center, Perpignan, Fr
 2020: The Dark side of the dream, Galerie Frey, Vienna, Austria
 2019: Il lato oscuro della felicità, Vento Blu Art Gallery, Polignano, Italy
 2018: Femmes au bord de la crise de guerre, Galerie Mark Hachem, Paris, Fr
 2018: Quid novi ?, Crypte de la Cathédrale, Grasse, Fr
 2017: Le Parfum, cet obscur objet du désir, Musée International de la Parfumerie, Grasse, Fr
 2017: L’Ultimo giorno prima dell’Eternità, San Silvestro al Quirinale, Rome, Italy
 2016: Sale Temps, Galerie Mark Hachem, Paris, Fr
 2015: Violent Luxury, Shirin Gallery NY, New York, USA
 2015: Palazzo Barbarigo Nani Mocenigo, Venice, Italy
 2015: Passion(s), Gaia Gallery, Istanbul, Turkey
 2015: Transparencies, Art Space Gallery, London, UK
 2014: Galerie der Moderne, Klosterneuburg Monastery, Klosterneuburg, Austria
 2014: Mythification/Mystifications, Mark Hachem Gallery, Beirut, Lebanon
 2013: Yourope in Progress, Fondation Valmont - Palazzo Bonvicini, Venice, Italy
 2010: TheNumber4 Gallery, Kuwait City, Kuwait
 2009: L'illusoire réel et le réel illusoire, Galerie Bernard Mourier, Saint-Rémy-de-Provence, Fr
 2008: Kamil Interior Design and Art Gallery, Monaco
 2004: Statuts de femmes, Town hall of the 13th arrondissement of Paris, Paris, Fr
 2006: Vénus/désastres, Sainte-Réparate Gallery, Nice, Fr
 2006: Rapt, Alliance française de Montevideo, Montevideo, Uruguay
 2005: Terminus ou les Vanités contemporaines, Abbey, Valbonne, Fr

Group 

2022: Exode(s), Parcours Art Contemporain, Saint-Raphaël, Fr
2022: Mise en Cène, The R. Castang Collection, Chapelle du Quartier Haut, Sète, Fr
2018: Summer group show, Ca' d'Oro, New York, USA
2016: Middle East Art Exhibition, Basel Art Center, Basel, Switzerland
2015: Vitraria Glass+A Museum, Palazzo Nani Mocenigo, Venice, Italy
2015: Maddox Gallery (Curated by James Nicholls), London
2014: Galerie der Moderne, Klosterneuburg Closter, Vienna
2011: Zwischen Tür und Angel, Sigmund Freud Museum, Vienna
2010: Lateral Bodies, Spazio Thetis, Venice, Italy
2007: Freud... beau comme un symptome, International Contemporary Art Center, Carros, Fr

Gallery

References

External links 

 Official Website

French artists

Living people
1946 births
20th-century French male artists
21st-century French male artists